James Roesener is an American politician in the state of New Hampshire. He is a member of the New Hampshire House of Representatives from the 22nd district, having been first elected in 2022; this election made him the first openly transgender man to win election to any state legislature in the United States. Roesener is a member of the Democratic Party.

Personal life
Roesener is openly transgender and bisexual. He lives in Concord, New Hampshire and is married to a woman.

References

21st-century American politicians
Living people
Democratic Party members of the New Hampshire House of Representatives
LGBT state legislators in New Hampshire
Transgender politicians
Year of birth missing (living people)